Lord is a general title denoting deference applied to a male person of authority, religious or political, or a deity.

Lord or The Lord may also refer to:

Arts and entertainment 

 Lord (band), an Australian heavy metal band
 "The Lord" (song), by the Bee Gees, 1969
 "Lord", a song by Gucci Mane from Evil Genius
 Lord (manga), a Japanese manga by Ryoichi Ikegami and Buronson
 The Lord (The Hitchhiker's Guide to the Galaxy), a fictional cat in The Hitchhiker's Guide to the Galaxy
 Legend of the Red Dragon (LORD), a text-based role playing BBS game

Places 
 Lord, Iran, a village in Kermanshah Province
 Lord River (Canada), British Columbia, Canada

Other uses 
 Lord (surname), a list of people with this surname
 The Lord (book), a 1937 Christological book by Romano Guardini
 Lord (horse), a New Zealand-born Thoroughbred racehorse
 Lord Corporation, an American technology company

See also 

 Lorde (disambiguation)
 Lords (disambiguation)
 House of Lords (disambiguation)
 Milord (disambiguation)